Zhang Jianzhi (born 28 January 2000) is a Chinese footballer currently playing as a goalkeeper for Guangzhou.

Career statistics

Club
.

References

2000 births
Living people
Chinese footballers
Association football goalkeepers
Guangzhou F.C. players
Chinese Super League players